Mansureh-ye Olya (also Romanized as Mansūreh-ye ’Olyā and Mansūreh-e-’Olyā; also known as Manşūreh, Manşūreh-ye Bozorg, and Mansuri) is a village in Hoseyni Rural District, in the Central District of Shadegan County, Khuzestan Province, Iran. At the 2006 census, its population was 3,189, in 605 families.

References 

Populated places in Shadegan County